The third season of Superstore, the U.S. television series, was ordered on February 14, 2017. The season premiered on September 28, 2017, and contained 22 episodes. The series continues to air in the same timeslot Thursday at 8:00 PM, though the episode "Christmas Eve" aired on Tuesday, December 5. The season concluded on May 3, 2018.

Superstore follows a group of employees working at Cloud 9, a fictional big-box store in St. Louis, Missouri. The ensemble and supporting cast features America Ferrera, Ben Feldman, Lauren Ash, Colton Dunn, Nico Santos, Nichole Bloom and Mark McKinney.

Cast

Main
America Ferrera as Amy Dubanowski 
Ben Feldman as Jonah Simms
Lauren Ash as Dina Fox
Colton Dunn as Garrett McNeil
Nico Santos as Mateo Fernando Aquino Liwanag
Nichole Bloom as Cheyenne Thompson
Mark McKinney as Glenn Sturgis

Recurring
 Michael Bunin as Jeff Sutin
 Johnny Pemberton as Bo Derek Thompson
Kaliko Kauahi as Sandra Kaluiokalani
 Linda Porter as Myrtle Vartanian
 Josh Lawson as Tate Staskiewicz
 Jon Barinholtz as Marcus White
 Kelly Stables as Kelly Watson
 Kelly Schumann as Justine Sikowitz
 Kerri Kenney-Silver as Jerusha Sturgis
 Jennifer Irwin as Laurie Neustadt

Episodes

Production

Casting
It was announced on July 28, 2017, that Kelly Stables had been cast in a recurring role as new Cloud 9 employee named Kelly, who, as a recently divorced woman, strikes up a relationship with Ben Feldman's character Jonah.

Timeslot changes
On May 14, 2017, NBC originally announced that Superstore would be moving its timeslot from Thursday at 8:00 PM to Tuesday at 9:00 PM with returning series This Is Us anchoring Thursday night. However, on May 30, 2017, NBC reverted its decision and moved it back to its original timeslot along with returning comedies The Good Place, Will & Grace and Great News.

Ratings

References

External links
 
 
 

Superstore (TV series)
2017 American television seasons
2018 American television seasons